The U.S. Go Congress is the largest annual Go event in the United States, first held in 1985 and now into its 35th consecutive year. It is organized by the American Go Association in conjunction with one or more local clubs, and is a week-long tournament and learning opportunity for Go players. Several hundred people generally attend, including a number of professional players. A few major tournaments are incorporated into the week, including the U.S. Open and the North American Masters (NAMT) tournament.

U.S. Go Congresses and Winners

U.S. Open
The U.S. Open is a six-round Swiss-McMahon Go tournament with the longest time limits of any North American tournament. The Open is the largest Go tournament in North America. In 2006 and 2007, the tournament's top prize was $2,000.

Players are grouped by strength into different sections. These range from beginners (33kyu - 30kyu) to the advanced open section (7 dan and above).

Until 2014, High dan players (4 dan and above) received a base time of 120 minutes with 5 - 30 second byo-yomi periods.  All other players received a base time of 90 minutes with 5 - 30 second byo-yomi periods. Starting from 2014, all players in the U.S. Open received the same time of 90 minutes base time with 5 - 30 second byo-yomi periods.

Additionally, beginning in 2014, the open section of the U.S. Open (7 dan and above) was combined with the North American Ing Masters into a 9-round tournament with a top prize of $5,000. Players who were not 7 dan but had accumulated a sufficient number of qualifier points were also eligible to play in this section. Players who were 7 dan or above who did not wish to play in the North American Masters Tournament were allowed to play in the top section of the U.S. Open, which now combined 6 dan and 7 dan players, albeit with a lower amount of prize money at stake.

North American Ing Masters

See also

 Go at the 2010 Asian Games
 Go competitions
 International Go Federation
 List of Go organizations
 List of professional Go tournaments

External links
This year's US Go Congress webpage
US Open history

References

Go (game)
Go competitions in North America